Lysanne Tusar is the founding Director and CMO of Hong Kong's only winery, The 8th Estate Winery.

Background 

Lysanne was born in Vancouver, British Columbia, Canada. She attended University of British Columbia and completed her BA in 2004. During school and after graduating, she spent time working across Canada and the United States for marketing, PR and advertising firms and in-house companies that specialized in a wide selection of beverages.

Career
In 2007, Tusar opened the 8th Estate Winery in Ap Lei Chau, Hong Kong and the first vintage of wine released was in 2008. Tusar's wine has won awards including the 2011 Cathay Pacific International Wine & Spirit Competition  and the Shanghai International Wine Challenge 2012.

References

Businesspeople from Vancouver